Sarwat Karim Ansari is an Indian politician from the Bahujan Samaj Party, in the state of Uttarakhand.

Sarwat Karim Ansari represented the Manglaur constituency in the 3rd Uttarakhand legislative Assembly.

Positions held

Electoral Performances

References

Living people
Year of birth missing (living people)
20th-century Indian politicians
Bahujan Samaj Party politicians from Uttarakhand
People from Haridwar district
Uttarakhand MLAs 2012–2017
Uttarakhand MLAs 2022–2027